List of chairmen of the Supreme Council of Khakassia.

This is a list of chairmen (speakers) of the Supreme Council of the Republic of Khakassia:

Sources

Lists of legislative speakers in Russia
Chairmen